Fabiola Campillai (born May 17, 1983) is a Chilean Senator known for losing her sight in a case of police brutality in the 2019–2022 Chilean protests.

She is a former worker and firefighter. On November 26, 2019, she was hit by a tear gas grenade permanently losing the sight in both eyes and the senses of olfaction and taste. Campillai was going to her nighttime work when she was hit by the grenade. She was accompanied by her sister, Ana María, when the incident happened. Ana María immediately confronted the police squad who shot the grenade, but had a grenade shot next to her causing her dress to catch fire. As the police denied Fabiola aid, Ana María shouted for help to which a neighbour reacted and brought Fabiola to hospital in his car. The next day police showed up outside Ana Marías house aiming to bring her to the police station, without showing any valid arrest warrant, which Ana María rejected after consulting with her lawyer. As of June 19, 2020, no suspect had been identified, but then on August 14, 2020, two police officers were fired for their involvement in the case. Both the officer in charge of the squad and the one who shot have been identified, and the latter brought to justice. The involved officers deny having aimed at her body or noticed that Fabiola had been injured.

Campillai and Gustavo Gatica, another well-known victim of police brutality, were part of campaign advertising for the "Approve" option in the 2020 Chilean national plebiscite held on October 25, 2020. In November 2021 Campillai was elected senator for Santiago Metropolitan Region with 15% of the valid votes in the 2021 Chilean general election, receiving more votes than any other candidate in her district. She celebrated her election in Plaza Baquedano.

References

1983 births
Living people
Blind politicians
Chilean blind people
Chilean people of Diaguita descent
Women members of the Senate of Chile
Victims of police brutality
People from Maipo Province
Senators of the LVI Legislative Period of the National Congress of Chile